"Young Andrew" is a folk song catalogued as Child ballad 48.

Synopsis
Andrew seduces Helen and tells her he will fulfill his promise to marry her only if she brings him her father's gold.  She does.  He robs her not only of it but all her clothing.  She goes home, naked.  Her father is furious.  Her heart breaks, killing her, and her father regrets it.  Meanwhile, Andrew encountered a wolf in the woods, and it killed him; the gold still lies by his body.

Variants
This ballad contains motifs from both "Lady Isabel and the Elf-Knight" (Child 4) and "The Fair Flower of Northumberland" (Child 9).

This tale is found in German, Polish, and Danish variants.

See also
List of the Child Ballads

References

Child Ballads
Year of song unknown
Songwriter unknown